The fourth edition of the Pan Pacific Swimming Championships, a long course (50 m) event, was held in 1991 in Edmonton, Alberta, in the Kinsmen Sports Center from August 22–25.

Results

Men's events

Women's events

References
Results on GBRSports.com

 
Pan Pacific Swimming Championships
P
Pan Pacific
P
Swimming competitions in Canada
Pan Pacific